Bambassi (native name: Màwés Aasʼè) is an Omotic Afroasiatic language spoken in Ethiopia around the towns of Bambasi and Didessa in the area east of Asosa in Benishangul-Gumuz Region. The parent language group is the East Mao group. Alternative names for the language are Bambeshi, Siggoyo, Amam, Fadiro, Northern Mao, Didessa and Kere.

The most current information on the number of Bambassi speakers is not known, as the 2007 census grouped the Mao languages together, despite low lexical similarity. 33,683 mother tongue speakers of Maogna (covering Bambassi, Hozo and Seze) were listed.



Similarities 
Bambassi has a 31% lexical similarity with other Omotic languages.

Phonology 
Bambassi has 5 vowels: /a, e, i, o, u/. The vowels have lengthened forms, and Bambassi has contrastive vowel length.

Orthography

Vowels and tones 
 a - [a]
 aa - [aː]
 e - [e]
 ee - [eː]
 i - [i]
 ii - [iː]
 o - [o]
 oo - [oː]
 u - [u]
 uu - [uː]
 á - high tone
 a - middle tone
 à - low tone

Consonants
 b - [b]
 c' - [t͡s']
 ch - [t͡ʃ]
 d - [d]
 g - [g]
 h - [h]
 k - [k]
 k' - [k']
 l - [l]
 m - [m]
 n - [n]
 ng - [ŋ]
 p - [p/f/ɸ]
 p' - [p']
 r - [ɾ]
 s - [s]
 sh - [ʃ]
 t - [t]
 t' - [t']
 w - [w]
 y - [j]
 z - [z]

Notes

Further reading 
Ahland, Michael. 2009. "Aspects of Northern Mao (Bambassi-Diddesa) phonology."Linguistic Discovery 7: 1-42.
Alemayehu Dumessa. 2007. Word Formation in Diddessa Mao. Addis Ababa University, MA thesis. Web access
Wedekind, Charlotte, Klaus Wedekind and Ralph Siebert. 2002. "Third S.L.L.E. survey on languages of the Begi/Asosa area.", SIL Electronic Survey Reports 2002-056

Languages of Ethiopia
Omotic languages
Mao languages